Harri Matias Koskela (born 8 October 1965 in Lapua) is a Finnish wrestler and Olympic medalist in Greco-Roman wrestling.

Olympics
Koskela competed at the 1988 Summer Olympics in Seoul where he received the silver medal in Greco-Roman wrestling, the light heavyweight class.

World championships
Koskela received a silver medal at the 1990 FILA Wrestling World Championships, and a bronze medal at the 1991 FILA Wrestling World Championships.

References

External links
 

1965 births
Living people
People from Lapua
Olympic wrestlers of Finland
Wrestlers at the 1988 Summer Olympics
Wrestlers at the 1992 Summer Olympics
Wrestlers at the 1996 Summer Olympics
Finnish male sport wrestlers
Olympic silver medalists for Finland
Olympic medalists in wrestling
Medalists at the 1988 Summer Olympics
Sportspeople from South Ostrobothnia
20th-century Finnish people
21st-century Finnish people